Sonetos de la Muerte (Sonnets of Death) is a work by the Chilean poet Gabriela Mistral, first published in 1914. She used a nom de plume as she feared that she may have lost her job as a teacher. The work was awarded first prize in the Juegos Florales, a national literary contest.

The Sonnets of Death were inspired by the suicide of Mistral's former lover, Romelio Ureta, in which she claims for his love, argues jealousy and discusses their reunion after their deaths. However Mistral's relationship with Ureta is a matter of significant controversy.  It is claimed by Chilean experts, such as Cedomil Goic, that the publication of the Sonnets of Death marks the beginning of modern poetry in Chilean literature.

References

External links
The Spanish-language text of the poem may be found here

1914 poems
Spanish-language books
Spanish poetry